Katija Zubčić (born 15 December 1952) is a Croatian actress.

Filmography

Television roles

Movie roles

References

External links

1952 births
Living people
Croatian actresses
Croatian stage actresses
Croatian television actresses
Croatian film actresses
Actors from Zadar